Dororo is a Japanese anime television series based on Osamu Tezuka's manga series of the same name. The 24-episode series was broadcast from January 7 to June 24, 2019, on Tokyo MX, BS11, and Jidaieki Senmon Channel, and was streamed exclusively worldwide on Amazon Prime Video. The episodes were collected in two Blu-ray volumes released in Japan on May 22 and August 21, 2019.

Kazuhiro Furuhashi directs the series, with Yasuko Kobayashi handling series composition, Satoshi Iwataki handling character designs, and Yoshihiro Ike composing the music. Twin Engine produces the series. The soundtrack of the series was released on August 14, 2019 in two different editions. A guidebook featuring Hiroyuki Asada's art was released in Japan on August 2, 2019.

The series was licensed by Sentai Filmworks for an English release in March 2021. Sentai's deal includes distribution rights for the United States, Canada, United Kingdom, Australia, New Zealand, South Africa, Latin America, Spain, Portugal, the Netherlands, and Nordic and Scandinavian countries. The Blu-ray disk of the series was released by Sentai on June 29, 2021. Madman Entertainment released it in Australia on October 6, 2021.



Episode list

References

External links
  
 

Dororo (2019 TV series)